Wyse (formerly stylized as "wyse") is a Japanese rock group that formed in 1999. Its members are In 2005 they broke up and gave out their last album entitled 19990214-20050213 only to come back together in 2011. It is said earlier when they first started they paid a lot of attention to their style like most Visual Kei bands but after a while they toned down on it.

Band members

Discography
Singles
 'It's not like me It's not like you' (1 July 2001)
 'Rojiura no Ruru' (1 August 2001)
 'thoughtful Day' (1 September 2001)
 'Perfume' (13 March 2002)
 'bring you my heart' (29 May 2002)
 'Twinkle Stars' (28 August 2002)
 'Air' (10 September 2003)
 'Prism' (12 January 2004) - A free CD with 3 different package designs given at Wyse TOUR 2004 in Zepp Tokyo
 'Distance' (14 July 2004)

Albums
 With... (1 September 2000) - A 5,000 limited prints
 DEAD LEAVES SHOWER (1 December 2000) - A 10,000 limited prints
 PERFECT JUICE (1 March 2001) - A 10,000 limited prints
 the Answer in the Answers (WEA)(12 December 2001)
 Calm (WEA) (9 October 2002)
 Beat (14 May 2003)
 WxYxSxE (12 May 2003)
 Marine Disc (29 May 2004)
 Wine Disc (29 May 2004)
 Colors (3d) (January 24, 2005)
 19990214-20050213 (WEA) (April 4, 2005)
 Imaging (July 8, 2012)
 TREE -Evolve- (July 13, 2013) - MORI Select Disc/wyse Retake Album
 Surely in the mind (September 1, 2013)
 TREE -Flame- (June 14, 2014) - HIRO Select Disc/wyse Retake Album

DVD
 The Roots of "Dauntless Rider" (21 March 2003)
 PRIVATE DISC #01 "Vision" (July 2, 2011)
 20110702 - wyse live 2011 "chain" at LIQUID ROOM (September 1, 2011)
 PRIVATE DISC #03 "To shy"(September 23, 2011)
 wyse Tour 2012 "Imaging Brain" Documentary (May to June, 2012)

VHS Tape
 199904 (1 January 2003)
 200112 (1 January 2003)
 The Roots of "Dauntless Rider" (21 March 2003)

Trivia
 Wyse is with the same recording company as Kyary Pamyu Pamyu, Warner Music Japan.
 In an interview when asked what members they would date if they were women replied with "MORI or HIRO." (Tsukimori), "None of them because I hate them all." (HIRO), "I would prefer myself because I'm a bit of a narcissist." (TAKUMA). MORI didn't reply but their ex drummer KENJI replied with "Tsukimori because I like him."
 When asked in the same interview what would they be if not for Wyse, Tsukimori replied with the silly answer "A dog."
 Wyse are best friends with the band Waive.
 Waive broke up the same year as Wyse and got back together also the same year as Wyse. Both bands also no longer have an official drummer.
 It is unknown whether they still consider themselves Visual Kei or not.

External links
 Wyse official site
 Wyse official Youtube
 Wyse official Twitter

Japanese rock music groups
Visual kei musical groups